Stade Barema Bocoum is a multi-use stadium in Mopti, Mali.  It is currently used mostly for football matches. It serves as a home ground of Débo Mopti.  It also hosted some matches for the 2002 African Cup of Nations.  The stadium holds 30,000 people and was opened in 2001. It is named after foreign minister Baréma Bocoum.

Barema Bocoum
Mopti
Sports venues completed in 2001
2001 establishments in Mali